Adrien McNaughton (born November 4, 1966) was a five-year-old Canadian boy who went missing on June 12, 1972.

Disappearance
While on a family fishing trip at Holmes Lake near Calabogie, Ontario, Adrien had been fishing for about an hour with his father, Murray McNaughton. Adrien became tired and stopped fishing because his line was tangled. He sat down on a nearby rock, then left the lakeshore to play a short distance away. He then wandered away from his father, his two older brothers, and a friend of his father into a wooded area. The father noticed Adrien was missing and sent Adrien's eldest brother, Lee McNaughton, to the car to search for him. When Lee didn't find Adrien a search was sent out to find him. Hours later, when Adrien was not found, the police were contacted. At the time of his disappearance he was wearing a blue nylon parka, an orange striped shirt, brown shorts, and boots with rubber soles.

Investigation
A huge search was conducted to find McNaughton. Thousands of volunteers led by the armed forces searched the area where Adrien had gone missing. Extensive searching was conducted, but no clue to his whereabouts was found.

Aftermath
In 2009, with the use of new digital technology, his parents hoped to find him as an adult. Also in 2009, when Adrien's parents were contacted by the Toronto Sun, his mother declined to be interviewed and referred questions to the police. A CBC original podcast called Someone Knows Something investigated Adrien McNaughton's disappearance, beginning in 2015. The show is hosted, written and produced by award-winning Canadian filmmaker David Ridgen, and its first episodes were released in March 2016. On April 23, 2016, as part of the investigation for SKS, five highly trained volunteers conducted a search dive of Holmes Lake, looking for the remains of McNaughton, after four separate cadaver dogs indicated that they were detecting human remains in the area. A tooth-like object and small piece of rubber that may have belonged to a shoe were uncovered under eight feet of water. The tooth-like object was examined by the police and was found to be not of human origin.
In March 2018, the SKS and the team of volunteers conduct a fourth search of Holmes Lake for Adrien McNaughton, this time using a core sampler. They discover that the lake reaches depths of over 30ft with stacked layers of silt, debris, sediment separated by sections of water. Three cadaver dogs are taken over the samples and give 'the final response' on two samples this behaviour is how the dog indicates positive confirmation of human remains. The discoveries are reported to the local police who send their own divers to the lake only to conclude what was already know that a dive search would be impossible to find remains due to the poor visibility and deep layers of sediment. While the SKS team believe there are human remains at that specific location where the core samples were taken it's not confirmed they are Adrians.

See also
List of people who disappeared

References 

1970s missing person cases
1972 in Ontario
Missing Canadian children
Missing person cases in Canada